Abersychan School is a state-funded and non-selective comprehensive school in the Pontypool suburb of Abersychan, Wales.

Admissions
Abersychan School has 920 pupils on roll. It serves the north of Torfaen including the communities of Blaenavon, Garndiffaith, Talywain, Abersychan, Pontnewynedd, Cwmffrwdoer, Trevethin, Penygarn and St Cadocs. The local diversity is exemplified by the fact that some areas qualify for Communities First status, while the northern half of the Afon Llwyd encompasses a World Heritage Site.

The school supports a Special Needs Resources Base for pupils in Torfaen with MLD.

History

Comprehensive
The closure of Trevethin Community School in September 2007 has resulted in large numbers of pupils from its former catchment choosing Abersychan as their preferred school.

The re-organisation of education in the north of the borough was supported by a capital investment in Abersychan School which has improved the teaching and learning facilities, most notably in the form of several classrooms, a sports laboratory, an ICT suite with a 60 PC capacity, an Art and Technology design area, a floodlit astro-turf and a sports field. In 2009 a multi-media learning plaza was opened.  In January 2008, the school received a Welsh Secondary Schools Association award for its outstanding contribution to the transition of pupils from the Trevethin Community School to Abersychan School during the period 2006–2007.

Senior leadership team for 2020/2021
Phillip Collins (Headteacher)
Keri Powell (Deputy Headteacher)
Anthony Ager (Assistant Headteacher - Curriculum and Standards)
Catherine Rumble (Assistant Headteacher - Inclusion and Wellbeing)
Daniel Mutlow (Assistant Headteacher - Teaching and Learning)
Belinda Edwards-Lloyd (Business and Facilities Manager)

Heads of year for 2020/2021
Katie Harry (Head of Year 7)
Paul Loukisas (Head of Year 8)
Geraint Williams (Head of Year 9)
Bethan Jones (Head of Year 10)
Gareth Jenkins (Head of Year 11)

Heads of curriculum for 2020/2021
Louise Brunton (Head of English and Literacy)
Daniel Evans (Head of Mathematics and Numeracy)
Charlotte O'Connell (Head of Science and Technology)
Rachel Jenkins (Head of Expressive Arts)
Paul Michael (Head of Health and Wellbeing)
Barrie Evans (Head of Humanities)
Michelle Wilkshire (Head of Languages)
Laura Entwistle (Head of Skills and Welsh Bacc)

Wellbeing support team for 2020/2021
Catherine Rumble (assistant headteacher - Inclusion and Wellbeing)
Nicola Strachan (ALENCo)
Rob Barrowdale (wellbeing manager)
Kathryn Watkins (KS3 wellbeing support officer)
Emma Evans (KS4 wellbeing support officer)
Rachel Lewis (attendance and family engagement officer)

Sports
Teams from the school have won regional, national and UK competitions in Magistrates' Courts, Stock Market Challenge, Girls' Rugby, Design and Construction, and Dance.

Notable alumni

Abersychan Comprehensive School

 Ryan Doble - footballer
 David Llewellyn - novelist
 Mark Taylor - rugby union player

Abersychan Grammar School
 Prof Geoffrey Arthur, professor of veterinary surgery from 1974 to 1979 at the University of Bristol, and professor of veterinary obstetrics and diseases of reproduction from 1965 to 1973 at the Royal Veterinary College
 Sarah Clark, Bishop of Jarrow in the Church of England
 Allen Forward - international rugby player
 Roy Jenkins, Baron Jenkins of Hillhead - founder of Social Democrat Party, and Labour MP from 1950 to 1977 for Birmingham Stechford, and SDP MP from 1982 to 1987 for Glasgow Hillhead
 Rear-Admiral Brinley Morgan CB, director from 1970 to 1975 of the Naval Education Service
 Robert Ryder, pathologist who found the link between emphysema and coal dust

References

External links
 Abersychan Comprehensive School

News items
 Schoolgirl murdered in 2002

Secondary schools in Torfaen